Domingo Massaro (born 28 August 1927) was a Chilean football player and referee.  As a player, he represented Chile in the 1952 Olympic tournament. He refereed in the Primera División de Chile. He is most famous for refereeing the second leg of the 1968 Copa Libertadores finals.

References

External links

1927 births
Living people
Chilean footballers
Olympic footballers of Chile
Footballers at the 1952 Summer Olympics
Chilean football referees
Association football midfielders
Footballers at the 1951 Pan American Games
Pan American Games bronze medalists for Chile
Medalists at the 1951 Pan American Games
Pan American Games medalists in football
20th-century Chilean people